Grupo Caliente is one of the largest sports betting company in Mexico. In 2021 Grupo Caliente owned around 200 "off-track betting and bookmaking outlets" in Mexico, Austria, Brazil, Ecuador, Panama, Paraguay, Peru, Uruguay, Venezuela and the Caribbean. Business divisions of Grupo Caliente include Globalsat, Caliente Estadio, Caliente Online, and Caliente Casino. Owned Caliente Baja California, Caliente Casino is a chain of casinos operating mainly in the state of Baja California, Mexico, where it is the exclusive operator of casinos in Tijuana.

History
The company Grupo Caliente was first formed in 1916 when the early version of the Agua Caliente Racetrack was built in Tijuana. In 1998, Caliente began to diversify with the Spanish Codere Group. Bingo was introduced, then electronic game terminals, with 900 installed at the Agua Caliente Racetrack. In 2014, the Desert Sun reported that "the Agua Caliente Casino and Resort in Tijuana, founded... in 1928, is thriving with customers from Southern California." In 2015, the dog racing circuit was one of 20 tracks in seven US states and Tijuana - it was the lowest ranked track on the circuit, and the only location in Mexico. At the time, it had 375 dogs, down from 1,000 at its zenith.

The company has collaborated with Euro Games Technology on electronic gaming lounges at the Hipódromo de Agua Caliente, opened in 2019. In 2021, some Caliente Casino machines were closed temporarily over debt to the city council in Ensenada.  As of 2022, owner of Casino Caliente was Jorge Alberto Hank Rhon, and it was the "biggest sports betting company in Mexico." The company still operated Caliente Stadium in Tijuana with 13,333 seats at its opening. A one-time mayor of Tijuana, in January 2021, he started a campaign for governor of Baja California. At that time, Grupo Caliente owned around 200 "off-track betting and bookmaking outlets throughout Mexico, Austria, Brazil, Equador, Panama, Paraguay, Peru, Uruguay, Venezuela and the Caribbean."

Divisions
Business divisions of Grupo Caliente include Caliente Casino, Globalsat, Caliente Estadio, and Caliente Online.

Related companies listed on the website included ViajesPetra, Hotel Pueblo Amigo, Colegio Aleman, Caliente Club Canofilo, Caliente Jockey Club, Pueblo Amigo Shopping Center, Colegio Alemán Cuauhtémoc Hank, Pueblo Amigo, and the International Zoological Park.

Casino locations

As of April 2020 its website listed 45 casino locations in Baja California state (23 in Tijuana, also in Rosarito, Tecate, Mexicali and Ensenada), Nogales, Sonora, Morelia, Michoacán and Greater Mexico City. Caliente Casino is the exclusive operator of casinos in Tijuana and operates 23 locations in that city, some of which are frequented by visitors from the United States.

The company's main branch in Tijuana, Caliente Hipódromo, contains the Agua Caliente Racetrack. The primary Caliente Casino facility in Tijuana has 340 rooms, golf games, a nightclub, and a spa, along with the casino itself and horse and dog racing.

Teams
Grupo Caliente owned sport teams include:

 Club Tijuana
 Club Tijuana (women)
 Querétaro F.C.
 Querétaro F.C. (women)
 Dorados de Sinaloa
 Galgos de Tijuana

See also
Gambling in Mexico
Mexican Football Federation

References

External links

เว็บแทงบอลที่ดีที่สุด2023

Casinos in Mexico
Companies based in Tijuana
Buildings and structures in Tijuana
Sports betting